Wierszczyca  is a village in the administrative district of Gmina Jarczów, within Tomaszów Lubelski County, Lublin Voivodeship, in eastern Poland.

The village has an approximate population of 500.

References

Wierszczyca